Andrey Antanyuk (born 17 March 1995) is a Belarusian professional footballer who plays for Leskhoz Gomel.

References

External links
 
 
 Profile at Gomel website

1995 births
Living people
Belarusian footballers
Association football forwards
FC Gomel players
FC Granit Mikashevichi players
FC UAS Zhitkovichi players